Agelasta obscura is a species of beetle in the family Cerambycidae. It was described by McLeay in 1884.

References

obscura
Beetles described in 1884